Georgi Sapinev (born 8 January 1943) is a Bulgarian retired football player. Sapinev was an offensive midfielder.
He played for Marek Dupnitsa between 1961 and 1972 and earned 232 caps and scored 47 goals.

External links
PFC Marek Dupnitsa history 

1943 births
Living people
Bulgarian footballers
Association football midfielders
PFC Marek Dupnitsa players
First Professional Football League (Bulgaria) players
People from Dupnitsa
Sportspeople from Kyustendil Province